Johann Nepomuk Karl (Johann Nepomuk Karl Borromäus Josef Franz de Paula; 6 July 1724 – 22 December 1748) was the Prince of Liechtenstein between 1732 and 1748.

Early life
He was the son of Joseph Johann Adam, Prince of Liechtenstein and his second wife, Countess Maria Anna Katharina of Oettingen-Spielberg (1693-1729).

Life 
When his father died, Johann Nepomuk Karl was only eight and his uncle Josef Wenzel ruled as regent and took care of his nephew's education, preparing him for his future role. When Johann Nepomuk Karl took over the rule of his domains alone in 1745, it seemed that his uncle had taught him nothing, because the prince soon neglected the government and otherwise had seen little economic success.

Because of the evident inability of the prince, a royal Hungarian and Bohemian royal chamberlain was appointed to rule. The prince died shortly afterwards in 1748 at Wischau aged 24 years, being the youngest Prince of Liechtenstein to die.

Marriage and issue

In Vienna on 19 March 1744 Johann Nepomuk Karl married his cousin Maria Josepha, Countess of Harrach-Rohrau (20 November 1727 – 15 February 1788), daughter of Count Friedrich August von Harrach-Rohrau and his wife, Princess Maria Eleonora of Liechtenstein (1793-1757). They had three children:

 Princess Maria Anna (October 1745 – 27 April 1752).
 Prince Joseph Johannes Nepomuk Xaver Gotthard Adam Franz de Paula Frederick (5 May 1747 – 20 May 1747).
 Princess Maria Antonia Josepha Theresia Walburga (posthumously 13 June 1749 – 28 May 1813), married on 17 January 1768 to Prince Wenzel von Paar.

References
Evelin Oberhammer (Hrsg.): Der ganzen Welt ein Lob und Spiegel, Das Fürstenhaus Liechtenstein in der frühen Neuzeit. Publisher of history and politics/R. Oldenbourg ed., Vienna/München 1990,

External links 

 Johann Nepomuk Karl at Princely House of Liechtenstein

1724 births
1748 deaths
Modern child monarchs
Princes of Liechtenstein
18th-century Liechtenstein people